The Hoogovens Wijk aan Zee Steel Chess Tournament 1995 was the 57th edition of the Hoogovens Wijk aan Zee Chess Tournament. It was held in Wijk aan Zee in January 1995 and was won by Alexey Dreev.

The 1994 tournament again used a knockout match format, as in 1993, but has since reverted to its traditional round-robin format for all subsequent events. Alexey Dreev defeated Evgeny Bareev 2½ to 1½ in the final.

References

Tata Steel Chess Tournament
1995 in chess
1995 in Dutch sport